The South Pine River is a minor river located in South East Queensland, Australia. It rises on the D'Aguilar Range and passes through the Samford Valley in the Moreton Bay Region local government area.

Location and features

The South Pine River rises in the D'Aguilar Range below Mount Glorious near , northwest of Brisbane, and flows generally east, to form its confluence with the North Pine River at Lawnton, where the river forms the Pine River. Meeting with Albany Creek in the suburb of the same name, it carries the city council boundary between the Moreton Bay Regional Council and the Brisbane City Council down to its confluence. To the northwest of the South Pine River are the Pine Rivers suburbs of Strathpine and Lawnton, while on the southeast are Brisbane City Council suburbs Bridgeman Downs and Bald Hills. The river descends  over its  course.

On early maps the river was called Eden River.

The Pine Rivers Shire draws its name from the South Pine, North Pine and Pine Rivers.

See also

References

External links

 Moreton Bay Regional Council Waterways Management

Rivers of Queensland
Shire of Pine Rivers
South East Queensland